Union Station is a streetcar station, located on  H Street NE in the middle of the Hopscotch Bridge. It is located on the H Street/Benning Road Line of the DC Streetcar system.

History 
Union Station opened to the public as one of the original stations on February 27, 2016.

Station layout 
The terminus station consists of one side platform in the median of H Street, which opened on February 27, 2016.

References 

H Street/Benning Road Line
DC Streetcar stops
Streetcars in Washington, D.C.
Electric railways in Washington, D.C.
Street railways in Washington, D.C.
750 V DC railway electrification
Railway stations in the United States opened in 2016
2016 establishments in Washington, D.C.